Neville Wright (born 21 December 1980) is a Canadian bobsledder. Wright competed at the 2010 Winter Olympics in Vancouver in the four-man competition, finishing fifth.

Born in Edmonton, Alberta, Wright was a sprinter with the Alberta Golden Bears where his performance attracted the attention of Canadian bobsleigh officials. In 2009, he began training for the national bobsled team with Pierre Lueders.

References

External links
 Neville Wright at the 2010 Winter Olympics
 
 
 

1980 births
Living people
Athletes from Edmonton
Bobsledders at the 2010 Winter Olympics
Bobsledders at the 2014 Winter Olympics
Bobsledders at the 2018 Winter Olympics
Canadian male bobsledders
Canadian male sprinters
Olympic bobsledders of Canada
Universiade medalists in athletics (track and field)
Universiade bronze medalists for Canada
Medalists at the 2007 Summer Universiade